"Super Idol 2004" is the debut single by Stavros Konstantinou, the winner of Super Idol, the Greek version of Pop Idol.  Super Idol runner up Tamta duets on the song "Το Άλλο Μου Μισό".

The lead radio track from the CD, "Δεν Το Αντεχω", was the "winner's song" from Super Idol which was performed at the grand final on June 18, 2004 as well as the duet "Το Άλλο Μου Μισό". One music video was made for each of the two songs.

The CD had moderate success in Greece/Cyprus, placing at #7 on the Greek music charts.

Track listing
 Δεν Το Αντεχω
 Μη Με Ξυπνας
 Το Άλλο Μου Μισό (with Tamta Goduadze)
 Αποψε

References

2004 songs
2004 debut singles
Stavros Konstantinou songs
Super Idol (Greek TV series)